Florence Fleming Noyes (1871–1928) was an American classical dancer.

Biography
She was born in 1871. In 1912 she opened her first dance studio in Carnegie Hall and in 1913 she dressed as Liberty at the Capitol in Washington, D.C. as part of a tableau vivant to bring publicity for the cause of women's right to vote. In 1921 she founded two dance camps in Portland, Connecticut. They were the Shepherd's Nine for women, and the Junio. She died in 1928.

Publications
The Psychology of the New Education (1923)
Rhythm: The Basis of Art and Education (1923)

Legacy
The Noyes School of Rhythm in Manhattan, New York (1912-2002)
The Noyes School of Rhythm in Portland, Connecticut

References

External links

Florence Fleming Noyes at Flickr

American dancers
1871 births
1928 deaths